College Town is a suburb of Sandhurst.

College Town is home to a large and well-known out-of-town mercantile development, "The Meadows", which was built in 1988. It comprises a large Tesco Extra hypermarket and a Marks & Spencer, two of the largest in the country.

External links
 Meadows Shopping Centre
 Aldi Sandhurst

Villages in Berkshire
Sandhurst, Berkshire